Gulfam is a Pakistani costume film directed by S. Suleman in his directorial debut. It was produced by Darpan under his production banner Darpan Productions, who also played the leading role alongside Musarrat Nazir. The supporting actors include Nazar, S. Suleman and Talish. The music was composed by Rashid Attre with lyrics by Habib Jalib and Tanvir Naqvi. The film received a Nigar Award for best editing.

Plot 

The story of Gulfam is based on the backdrop of the conflict between the Muslims and the Roman nation. The plot primary revolves around the romance of a brave young man his bedouin beloved one.

Cast 

 Darpan
 Musarrat Nazir
 Nazar
 S. Suleman
 Himalyawala
 Talish
 Nasrin
 Rakhshi

Music

Release and box office 

Gulfam was released on 29 December 1961. The film celebrated the golden jubilee at the box office with a theatrical run of more than 50 weeks.

Awards 

The film received a Nigar Award for Best Editing to M. Akram.

Impact 

The commercial success of the film established the career of director S. Suleman due to which he went on to become one of the top directors of Pakistani cinema in the following years. The film became a trendsetter in the production of Costume films in 1960s which continued till mid 70s.

References

External links 
 

Pakistani black-and-white films
1961 films
Urdu-language Pakistani films
1960s Urdu-language films